Ole Distribution is a company which owns several pay television networks in the region of Latin America. Is founded as a joint venture between Warner Bros. Discovery and Ole Communications.

Distributed channels 
Warner Bros. Discovery distributes the following channels:

Owned by A+E Networks Latin America (owned by A+E Networks and Ole Communications):

 History Latin America
 H2 Latin America (started in July 2014 to replace Bio.)
 A&E Latin America
 Military History
 Lifetime Latin America (started in June 2014 to replace Sony Spin)

NBCUniversal International Networks Latin America:
 DreamWorks Channel Latin America (owned by Comcast/NBCUniversal and Ole Communications)
 E! Latin America (owned by Comcast/NBCUniversal and Ole Communications)
 Telemundo Internacional (except in Mexico. Owned by Comcast/NBCUniversal and Ole Communications)
 Universal TV Latin America and Universal+ Latin America (except in Brazil, where the channel is operated by a 50/50 joint venture between NBCU and Canais Globo and distributed by Canais Globo)
 Studio Universal (except in Brazil, where the channel is operated by a 50/50 joint venture between NBCU and Canais Globo and distributed by Canais Globo)
 Syfy (except in Brazil, where the channel is operated by a 50/50 joint venture between NBCU and Canais Globo and distributed by Canais Globo)

Sony Pictures Entertainment:

 Sony Channel
 Sony Movies
 AXN

Warner Bros. Entertainment (operated by Warner Bros. Discovery International):

 WarnerTV Latin America

OLE Communications

 IVC Network (except in Mexico and Brazil)

Defunct channels 

 Animax
 Bio.
 Locomotion
 Sony Spin
 Hallmark Channel
 TV Quality
 Tele Uno
 Mundo Olé
 A&E Mundo
 USA Network
 Calle 13
 Sci-Fi
 Movietime
 CBS Telenoticias

See also 

 Warner Bros. Discovery Americas

References

External links 

 Official Website

Latin American cable television networks
Warner Bros. Discovery subsidiaries
Mass media companies established in 2020